Michael Randolph Freelander FRACP (born 23 April 1953) is an Australian politician and paediatrician. He is a member of the Australian Labor Party (ALP) and has held the Division of Macarthur in the House of Representatives since the 2016 federal election.

Early life
Freelander was born in Sydney. His father Selwyn was a dentist and president of West Harbour RFC, while his mother Ruth was a preschool teacher. His paternal grandfather William Freelander arrived in Australia as a cabin boy and became mayor of Katoomba. Freelander attended Trinity Grammar School from 1965 to 1977 playing cricket and rugby and being appointed a prefect of the school. In the Higher School Certificate he qualified to study Medicine at Sydney University.

Medical career
Freelander studied medicine at the University of Sydney and is a Fellow of the Royal Australasian College of Physicians (FRACP). He trained as a paediatrician at the Royal Alexandra Hospital for Children. In 1984 he moved to the Macarthur region of Sydney and established his own practice, also working at Camden and Campbelltown Hospitals for several decades. He additionally lectured at the University of Western Sydney.

Politics
Freelander was elected to parliament at the 2016 federal election, defeating sitting Liberal member Russell Matheson in the Division of Macarthur. He was assisted by a favourable redistribution. He became the first Labor MP to hold Macarthur since the Keating Government lost the 1996 election, and gained increased majorities, after preference distribution, at the 2019 and 2022 elections.

Freelander has served on the House of Representatives Standing Committee on Health, Aged Care and Sport from 15 September 2016 and on the standing committee for Social Policy and Legal Affairs from 12 October 2016. He has also served as the Deputy Chair of the House of Representatives Standing Committee on Health, Aged Care and Sport.

Personal life
Freelander has six children with his wife Sharon, and had five grandchildren as of 2016. He has said that he is "not a particularly religious Jew, but I still describe myself as Jewish".

References

1953 births
Members of the Australian House of Representatives
Members of the Australian House of Representatives for Macarthur
Australian Labor Party members of the Parliament of Australia
Labor Right politicians
Jewish Australian politicians
Living people
21st-century Australian politicians
Australian paediatricians
University of Sydney alumni